Honda Advanced Technology is part of Honda's long-standing research and development program focused on building new models for their automotive products and automotive-related technologies, with many of the advances pertaining to engine technology. Honda's research has led to practical solutions ranging from fuel-efficient vehicles and engines, to more sophisticated applications such as the humanoid robot, ASIMO, and the Honda HA-420 Honda-jet, a six-passenger business jet.

Engine and environmental technology

i-VTEC

i-VTEC is the acronym for intelligent VTEC (Variable Valve Timing and Lift Electronic Control), an evolution of Honda's VTEC engine. The i-VTEC engine works by controlling the timing and lifting of the camshafts depending on engine speeds. The valves open a small amount during low engine speeds to achieve optimal fuel efficiency. The valves will open wider at higher engine speeds to achieve higher performance.

Honda i-VTEC (intelligent-VTEC) has VTC continuously variable timing of camshaft phasing on the intake camshaft of DOHC VTEC engines.  The technology first appeared on Honda's K-series four-cylinder engine family in 2001 (In the United States, the technology debuted on the 2002 Honda CR-V).

What is this referring to: The new mechanism debuted in 2003 with the V6 3.0-liter i-VTEC engine which used a new Variable Cylinder Management (VCM) technology that runs on six cylinders during acceleration but used only three cylinders during cruising and low engine loads. In 2006, Honda introduced the 1.8-liter i-VTEC engine for the Civic which could deliver accelerated performance equivalent to a 2.0-liter engine with fuel efficiency that is 6% better than the 1.7-liter Civic engine. The high power output with low emissions and fuel economy is largely contributed by the improvements in several areas:
 Delayed valve closure timing – This controls the intake volume of air-fuel mixture, allowing the throttle valve to remain wide open while reducing pumping losses of up to 16%, which allows the engine to deliver better power output.
 Drive-by-wire technology – This system provides increased precision control over the throttle valve when the valve timing changes, creating a better driving experience where the driver is unaware of any torque fluctuations.
 Restructured pistons – A more compact piston prevents residual gas accumulation which in turn suppresses engine knocking. In addition, oil retention is improved thus reducing friction and increasing fuel efficiency.
 2-bed catalytic converter – This is positioned immediately after the exhaust manifold, providing direct contact which allows for high-precision air-fuel ratio control to drastically reduce emission levels.
 Reduced engine weight – The mass of the connecting rods and overall materials used in building the engine frame is reduced, which helps the engine gain better power and fuel efficiency.

The i-VTEC technology is also integrated into Honda's hybrid vehicles to work in tandem with an electric motor. In Honda's 2006 Civic Hybrid, the 1.3-liter i-VTEC engine uses a 3-stage valve design, an advancement from the 2005 i-VTEC technology. Aside from weight and friction reduction, the engine operates on either low-speed timing, high-output timing or 4-cylinder idling when the VCM system is engaged, each yielding better engine output upon varying driving conditions. Its competency helped place the Honda Civic Hybrid as the third "Greenest Vehicle" in 2009. It can be found on most of Honda's new vehicles in showrooms and roads.

Earth Dreams Technology
Earth Dreams Technology are modifications to increase fuel-efficiency in the range of 10% by selected use of DOHC, variable timing control (VTC), bore pitch, direct injection, reduced cylinder block and camshaft thickness, reduced engine weight, Atkinson cycle, friction reduction, high-capacity exhaust gas re-circulation (EGR) and electric water pumps.

Integrated Motor Assist

The Integrated Motor Assist, or IMA as it is commonly known, is Honda's hybrid car technology that uses a gasoline-electric drive system developed to achieve higher fuel economy and low exhaust emissions without compromising engine efficiency. The IMA system uses the engine as the main power source and an electric motor as an assisting power during acceleration. It was first designed for the Honda Insight in 1999, which combined the electric motor with a smaller displacement VTEC engine and a lightweight aluminium body with improved aerodynamics. Low emissions target was realized when the car achieved the EU2000. In 2001, the Honda Insight Integrated Motor Assist system was declared "Best New Technology" by the Automobile Journalists Association of Canada (AJAC).

The development of the IMA system is a result of optimizing the various technologies that Honda has built over the years, including the lean-burn combustion, low-emission engines, variable valve timing, high-efficiency electric motors, regenerative braking, nickel-metal hydride (Ni-MH) battery technology and the microprocessor control. The target of this integrated system was to meet improvements in several areas:

 Recovery of deceleration energy
With the IMA system, the amount of energy regeneration during deceleration is optimized and friction is reduced. The recovered energy is used to supplement the engine's output during acceleration.

 Reduction of energy displacement
The IMA supports the engine during a low rpm normal driving range by utilizing the electric motor to generate a high-torque performance. When the gasoline engine enters a higher rpm range, the electric motor ceases and power output is supplied by the VTEC engine. The assistance from the electric motor reduces the work of the gasoline engine, allowing the engine to be downscaled. This results in better mileage and reduces fuel consumption.

 Idle stop system
The power from the electric motor is generated and conserved when the vehicle moves forward.
When brakes are applied, the IMA system shuts off the engine and conserved power from the electric motor is utilized. This minimizes vibration of the car body and saves fuel when the engine is idling. When the brakes are released, the electric motor will restart the engine.

Among the Honda car models that are using IMA:

Honda J-VX (model 1997 concept car)
Honda Insight (model 1999–2006, 2010–2014)
Honda Dualnote (model 2001 concept car)
Honda Civic Hybrid (model 2003–2016)
Honda Accord Hybrid (model 2005–2007)
Honda CR-Z (model 2009–2016)

Transmission technology

Safety
Honda operates two crash test laboratories to improve safety designs and technologies in their vehicles, resulting in the cars scoring five-star ratings in front and side crash tests. A new independent crash test report from Euro NCAP also assessed the 2009 Honda Accord, Honda Civic and Honda Jazz as among Europe's safest cars, with an overall five-star rating.

Vehicle Stability Assist
The Vehicle Stability Assist (VSA) was introduced by Honda to its vehicles in 1997. The term is Honda's version of Electronic Stability Control (ESC), an active safety feature developed to correct oversteer and understeer by using several sensors to detect loss of steering control and traction while simultaneously braking individual wheels to help the vehicle regain stability.

How VSA works
VSA combines the Anti-lock Braking System (ABS) and Traction Control System (TCS) with side-slip control to help stabilize the vehicle whenever it turns more or less than desired. ABS is an existing system that prevents the vehicle's wheels from locking up under braking, especially in slippery road conditions. For the ABS to work, the system relies on the computed input from a steering angle sensor to monitor the driver's steering direction, the yaw sensor to detect the momentum of which the wheels are steering (yaw rate), and a lateral acceleration (g-force) sensor to signal the changes in speed. At the same time, the TCS will prevent wheel slip during acceleration while the side-slip control stabilizes cornering when the rear or front wheels slip sideways (during oversteer and understeer).

Controlling oversteer - During oversteer, the rear end of the vehicle will spin out because the rotational speed of the rear wheels exceeds the front wheels. VSA will prevent the vehicle from spinning by braking the outer front wheel to produce an outward moment and stabilize the vehicle.

Controlling understeer -  During understeer, the front wheels lose traction during cornering due to excessive throttle and this causes the speed difference between the left and front wheels to decrease. When the vehicle steers outwards from the intended trajectory, VSA intervenes by reducing engine power and if necessary, also braking the inner front wheel

G-CON
Honda's G-CON technology aims to protect car occupants by controlling G-forces during a collision. Such collision safety is a result of specific impact absorption by the vehicle's body and frame.

How G-Con works
The structure of the car body is designed to absorb and disperse crash energy throughout the energy compartment. When impact absorption is maximised, the cabin intrusion is automatically minimised to effectively lessen injuries to both occupants and pedestrians.

To optimize front collision performance and reduce the impact when different sized vehicles collide, the G-CON technology is further developed to incorporate Advanced Compatibility Engineering, Honda's term for crash compatibility. Honda has announced that by 2009, the ACE will be a standard feature in all their passenger cars, regardless of size or price.

G-CON is also designed to improve pedestrian safety by minimizing head and chest injuries of the pedestrian during an accident. The company introduced an advanced test dummy, Polar III, which represents the human body and is equipped with sensors to measure the impact of energy on a human body during a car accident. The data obtained has been used to explore pedestrian safety by improving the design of the vehicles.

Advanced mobility
Honda also ventures into advanced mobility research where the findings were used to create ASIMO (Advanced Step in Innovative Mobility), the world's first humanoid robot, as well as Honda's first venture into flight mobility on 3 December 2003, which is HondaJet.

ASIMO

ASIMO, derived from Advanced Step in Innovative Mobility, is pronounced ashimo. It was originally a research and development program undertaken by Honda's associates to challenge the field of mobility. The advancement of the research prompted Honda to conceive a humanoid robot capable of interacting with humans and is able to function in society, such as supporting the disabled and elderly.

ASIMO started as a pair of mechanical legs and had been in development for over 20 years. E0, the first prototype, debuted in 1986 and evolved into prototype E7 in 1991. By 1993, the prototypes progressed to slightly more man-like walking robots. P1 was introduced in 1993, and subsequently P2 and P3 were presented in 1996 and 1997. The P3 robot was a gawky prototype standing at 160 cm tall and weighed 130 kg.

In 2000, ASIMO was unveiled as a robot with real-time, flexible walking technology which enables it to walk, run, climb and descend stairs. It is also built in with sound, face, posture, environment and movement recognition technology, and could even respond to Internet connectivity to report news and the weather.

By 2004, Honda announced new technologies that target a higher level of mobility which enabled the next-gen ASIMO to function and interact with people more naturally. The new technologies introduced include:

 Posture control technology– Walking speed was increased from 1.6 km/h to 2.5 km/h while running speed increased to 3 km/h. This is aided by a newly developed high-speed processing circuit, highly responsive and high power motor drive unit in addition to a lightweight and highly rigid leg structure. The accuracy and response rate is four times faster than the previous model, matching the equivalent speed of a person jogging.
 Autonomous Continuous Movement technology - This allows ASIMO to manoeuvre without stopping as it obtains information about its surrounding from its floor surface sensor. The floor surface sensor and visual sensors located in its head can detect obstacles so that ASIMO can autonomously change its path and avoid hitting humans or other potential hazards.
 Enhanced visual and force sensor technologies– The sensors are added to the wrists so ASIMO can move in sync with people and coordinate its movements to give and receive objects. It can also move forward or backward in response to the direction that its hand is pulled or pushed

With 2005's ASIMO model, Honda added advanced level of physical capabilities that allows ASIMO to operate in real-life environments and in sync with people. The new ASIMO weighed 54 kg and stood at 130 cm tall. It could carry objects using a cart, walk with a person while holding hands, perform the tasks of a receptionist, carry out delivery service and be an information guide. In addition to enhanced visual sensors, floor surface sensors and ultrasonic sensors, Honda developed an IC

Teleinteraction Communication Card which allows ASIMO to recognize the location and identity of the person who is standing within a 360-degree range. The IC card is held by the person with whom ASIMO interacts. Its mobility was also significantly improved, making it capable of running at 6 km/h and in circular pattern.

By 2007, Honda updated ASIMO with improved intelligence technology that enabled it to operate more autonomously. It could now walk to the nearest charging station to recharge its battery when its power falls under a certain level, and is also capable of choosing its movement when approaching people, whether stepping back or negotiate the right of way.

Honda was also determined to focus its area of research in intelligence capabilities, particularly in developing a technology that uses brain signals to control a robot's movements. By 2009, Honda announced that it has developed a new system, the Brain Machine Interface, which allows human to send commands to ASIMO through thought alone. The first-of-its-kind technology uses electroencephalography (EEG) and near-infrared spectroscopy to record brain activity, combined with a newly developed information-extraction technology to link the analysis and command ASIMO to move. An electronic helmet is developed to allow humans to control the robot just by thinking about making the movement. This was demonstrated by scientists at the Honda Research Institute, who showed that it took only a few seconds for thought to be translated into robotic action. The technology is still under development and is not yet ready for general use.

ASIMO have travelled across the globe to appear not only at motor shows and schools but prestigious science and engineering events. To demonstrate its latest capabilities, ASIMO introduced the versatility of the new Honda Insight at the 2009 Geneva Motor Show. It completed 54 rounds of 15-minute public performances over 13 days, running, walking and interacting with the crowd.

References

External links
 Background on Honda advanced technology
 https://web.archive.org/web/20071206082510/http://honda.se/sw2363.asp?Pid=523
 http://world.honda.com/factbook/auto/motorshow/200310/10.html
 https://web.archive.org/web/20090210030252/http://www.honda.net.my/technology/tech_hondajet.cfm

Honda